Andrew Lambert (born 11 August 1976) is a former professional rugby league footballer who played as a  in the 1990s and 2000s. He played at representative level for Scotland, and at club level for Workington Town and the York Wasps.

International honours
Andrew Lambert won caps for Scotland while at Workington Town in 1999 2-caps (sub).

References

Living people
Place of birth missing (living people)
Rugby league centres
Scotland national rugby league team players
Workington Town players
York Wasps players
1976 births